Gandhi Ashram refers to Sabarmati Ashram, in  Ahmedabad, India, one of the residences of Mahatma Gandhi. It can also refer to:

 Gandhi Ashram and Freedom Struggle Museum in Melandaha Upazila of Jamalpur District, Bangladesh
 Gandhi Ashram Trust, operating in Begumganj Upazila of Noakhali District, Bangladesh

See also
 Gandhi Ashram School, in Kalimpong, India